Mamalakandam is a village located around 32 km from Kothamangalam taluk in Ernakulam district. It is located with an average elevation of 1200 meters above sea level. The village became a known tourist attraction in Kothamangalam Taluk, after some vloggers posted the village's government high school photo in social media, that has the Elampassery waterfall in the backdrop.

References

Villages in Ernakulam district